Gobinda Bandi  is a Nepalese Politician and Minister of Law, Justice and Parliamentary Affairs. Previously a senior advocate, Bandi was inducted as minister under the quota of the CPN (Unified Socialist).

See also 
 CPN (Unified Socialist)

References 

Communist Party of Nepal (Unified Socialist) politicians

Living people
Year of birth missing (living people)
Government ministers of Nepal